"Jungle Love" may refer to:
"Jungle Love" (The Time song), a 1984 hit song by The Time
"Jungle Love" (Family Guy), an episode of the animated television series Family Guy
"Jungle Love" (Steve Miller Band song), a song by the Steve Miller Band from their 1977 album Book of Dreams
"Jungle Love", a song by Krizz Kaliko from his 2008 debut album Vitiligo
"Jungle Love", an episode of season 2 of Tom and Jerry Tales
Jungle Love (film), a 1990 Hindi movie